Ectoedemia septembrella is a moth of the family Nepticulidae. It is found in most of Europe, east to the eastern part of the Palearctic realm. It is also found in the Near East.

The wingspan is 5–6 mm.  The head is ferruginous to ochreous with a whitish collar. Antennal eyecaps whitish. Posterior tarsi whitish. Forewings dark fuscous, somewhat pale-sprinkled and with a subtriangular whitish tornal spot ; tips of apical cilia whitish. Hindwings grey. Adults are on wing in May and June and again in August.

The larvae feed on Hypericum bupleuroides, Hypericum caprifolium, Hypericum hircinum, Hypericum hirsutum, Hypericum hookerianum, Hypericum inodorum, Hypericum maculatum, Hypericum montanum, Hypericum nummularium, Hypericum patulum, Hypericum perforatum, Hypericum rhodoppeum, Hypericum serpyllifolium, Hypericum tetrapterum, Hypericum undulatum. They mine the leaves of their host plant. The mine consists of a long, winding corridor with a broad frass line. The corridor widens into a slightly inflated blotch. In this blotch, the frass is concentrated in the centre. Pupation takes place in a cocoon inside the blotch.

References

External links
Fauna Europaea
bladmineerders.nl
UKmoths
Swedish moths
Ectoedemia septembrella images at  Consortium for the Barcode of Life

Nepticulidae
Moths described in 1849
Moths of Asia
Moths of Europe
Taxa named by Henry Tibbats Stainton